Endocrossis flavibasalis is a species of moth of the family Crambidae.  It is found in India (the eastern Himalayas, Assam), China, Burma, Sumatra and New Guinea.

Subspecies
Endocrossis flavibasalis flavibasalis
Endocrossis flavibasalis interruptalis (Caradja in Caradja & Meyrick, 1933) (China: Guangdong)

References

Spilomelinae
Moths described in 1867